Åge is a Norwegian masculine given name. Variants include the Danish/Norwegian Aage and the Swedish Åke. People with the name Åge include:

Åge Aleksandersen (born 1949), Norwegian singer, songwriter and guitarist
Åge Austheim (born 1983), Norwegian politician
Åge Danielsen (born 1942), Norwegian civil servant
Åge Ellingsen (born 1962), Norwegian ice hockey player
Åge Bernhard Grutle (born 1952), Norwegian diplomat and royal servant
Åge Hadler (born 1944), Norwegian orienteering competitor
Åge Hareide (born 1953), Norwegian football coach and former player
Åge Hovengen (born 1927), Norwegian politician for the Labour Party
Åge Konradsen (born 1954), Norwegian politician for the Conservative Party
Åge Korsvold (born 1946), Norwegian businessperson and CEO of Kistefos
Åge Lundström (1890–1975), Swedish Air Force general and horse rider
Åge Maridal (born 1965), Norwegian footballer
Åge Nigardsøy (1954–2008), Norwegian organizational leader and disability rights activist
Åge Sten Nilsen (born 1969) Norwegian hard rock singer
Åge Nordkild (1951–2015), Norwegian politician
Åge Ramberg (1921–1991), Norwegian politician for the Christian Democratic Party
Åge Rønning (1925–1991), Norwegian writer and journalist
Åge Samuelsen (1915–1987), Norwegian Christian preacher and singer / artist
Åge Sørensen (1937–2022), Norwegian footballer
Åge Spydevold (1925–1982), Norwegian footballer
Åge Starheim (born 1946), Norwegian politician for the Progress Party
Åge Steen (born 1960), Norwegian football manager
Åge Storhaug (1938–2012), Norwegian gymnast
Åge Vedel Tåning (1890–1958), Danish ichthyologist
Åge Tovan (born 1947), Norwegian politician for the Labour Party
Hans Åge Yndestad (born 1980), Norwegian footballer
Jan Åge Fjørtoft (born 1967), former Norwegian footballer
Jon Åge Tyldum (born 1968), former Norwegian biathlete
Per-Åge Skrøder (born 1978), Norwegian ice hockey player
Rolf Åge Berg (born 1957), Norwegian ski jumper
Tor Åge Bringsværd (born 1939), author, playwright, editor and translator

See also
Aage

Norwegian masculine given names

da:Åge
sv:Åge